The Biltmore Fashion Park is an outdoor retail and dining mall located in the Biltmore District of Phoenix, Arizona, along East Camelback Rd. The Biltmore Fashion Park, as well as the surrounding business and residential district, are named after the historic Arizona Biltmore Hotel, nearby.

The shopping center first opened in 1963 and underwent a major renovation in 2002, which included the addition of new stores and restaurants, as well as a redesign of the outdoor spaces. Stores and brands include Saks Fifth Avenue, Macy's, Lululemon Athletica, Pottery Barn, Williams Sonoma, and Sephora. The center also features dining options, including The Capital Grille, True Food Kitchen, and Blanco Tacos + Tequila.

History
Anchored at that time by San Francisco's upscale I. Magnin, Saks Fifth Avenue and The Broadway, which opened in 1968, it was the city's original luxury shopping and dining destination. The mall was designed by Welton Becket and Associates and built by the Chanen Construction Company. The original Saks Fifth Avenue featured native stone walls and concrete Native American hieroglyphics. The Broadway Building which was the first expansion of the mall was designed by Charles Luckman and built by the Del E. Webb Corporation in 1968.

During the 1960s and 1970s, The Gittings Portrait Studio at the Biltmore photographed the likes of John Wayne, Bob Hope, Princess Grace of Monaco, Barry Goldwater, Red Skelton, Sophia Loren, and many other celebrities and well-known figures who frequented the Biltmore.

In the mid-1990s, the center was purchased by Taubman Centers for $115 million. During this period, the Biltmore underwent a transformation. Both original anchors changed hands, with Saks Fifth Avenue taking over I. Magnin's former space and Macy's taking The Broadway's former space. The center also introduced a number of new luxury retailers. The Biltmore was also chosen as one of three sites nationwide for The Galleries of Neiman Marcus; however, Neiman Marcus folded the concept two years later.

The Biltmore continued to remain as the dominant luxury collection in Phoenix, drawing the metropolitan area's at the time sole Allen Edmonds, Apple, Elizabeth Arden, Rangoni Firenze, Stuart Weitzman, and Waterworks stores. Tommy Bahama also opened a flagship store at the center.

By the early 2000s, Biltmore Fashion Park was purchased by Westcor, which initiated a relocation project of the more global brand names to the Fashion Square to allow more room for "home-grown" and "fashion-forward" stores.

References

Shopping malls in Arizona
Macerich
Buildings and structures in Phoenix, Arizona
Shopping malls in Maricopa County, Arizona
Tourist attractions in Phoenix, Arizona
Shopping malls established in 1963